Jacopo Bambini (1582–1629) was an Italian painter of the Baroque period, active mainly in Ferrara.

He trained with Domenico Mona. Along with Giulio Croma (Giulio Cromer), he set up a painter's academy in Ferrara. He painted three altarpieces for the cathedral: a Flight into Egypt, an Annunciation, and a Conversion of St. Paul. He died at Ferrara. An account of his other works will be found in Barotti's Future e Scolture di Ferrara.

References

1582 births
1629 deaths
16th-century Italian painters
Italian male painters
Italian Baroque painters
17th-century Italian painters
Painters from Ferrara